David Lee Cloutier (November 22, 1938 – November 6, 2017) was an American football safety in the American Football League (AFL) for the Boston Patriots. He played college football at the University of Maine.

Early years
Cloutier attended Gardiner High School in Maine, where he practiced football, basketball and track. In football he was a two-way player, running back on offense and safety on defense. As a senior, he scored a then school-record 114 points and received All-state honors. He contributed to a 22-1-1 record in his three seasons and two Class B state championships (1954 and 1955). 

He also was named to the All-state basketball team as a senior. In track, he set the state high school javelin record as a senior. He was second in the state in four events: javelin, high hurdles, broad jump and high jump.

College career
Cloutier accepted a football scholarship from the University of South Carolina. He transferred to the University of Maine after his freshman year, where he was a two-way player for team.

In 1959, he tied a school record with 159 rushing yards against Bates College, while also leading the team in rushing and scoring. In 1960, although he was limited with injuries, he finished second on the team in rushing. In 1961 as a senior, he led the team in scoring and finished second on the team in receiving, while contributing to an undefeated season. He finished his career with 174 carries for 1,025 yards and 92 points (seventh in school history).

In 1993, he was inducted into the University of Maine Sports Hall of Fame. In 2010, he was inducted into the Maine Sports Hall of Fame.

Professional career

Buffalo Bills
Cloutier was selected by the Dallas Cowboys in the eighteenth round (242nd overall) of the 1962 NFL Draft, but after failing to come to terms with the Cowboys, he chose to sign as an undrafted free agent with the Buffalo Bills of the American Football League on January 4, 1962. He was tried at offensive end to take advantage of his speed, before suffering an ankle injury and being later waived.

Boston Patriots
On March 3, 1964, he signed with the Boston Patriots of the American Football League after being a football head coach for Kennebunk High School (record 11-5) and playing running back for the Portland Seahawks of the Atlantic Coast Conference for one season. He became the first Maine native to play for the franchise.

Cloutier was converted into a free safety. He was cut on September 8, but was later re-signed. He was mostly used as a punt returner on special teams. He started in the American Football Conference Championship game against the Buffalo Bills. He was released on August 31, 1965.

Personal life
After football, Cloutier returned to Maine to work in real estate, which he continued after he moved to Florida. He died on November 6, 2017.

References

External links
Maine Sports Hall of Fame bio
Boston Patriots bio

1938 births
2017 deaths
People from Gardiner, Maine
Players of American football from Maine
American football cornerbacks
South Carolina Gamecocks football players
Maine Black Bears football players
Boston Patriots players